Ceremonies of the 21st Golden Melody Awards were held at the Taipei Arena in Taipei, Taiwan on June 26, 2010.

Eligibility

Registration for entry into the 21st Golden Melody Awards was opened from December 15, 2009 to January 4, 2010.

Nominees and winners

Popular Music categories

Song Of The Year
 "Come If You Dare" — A-mei
 "Desperado" — Super Band
 "Fish" — Cheer Chen
 "Riding A White Horse" — Lala Hsu
 "Singing in the Trees" — Claire Kuo

Pop Album Of The Year
 A-MIT — A-mei Hui Wei — Karen Mok
 If You See Him — Tanya Chua
 Immortal — Cheer Chen
 Lala Hsu — Lala Hsu

Best Male Pop Vocal Performance
 David Tao — Opus 69
 Eason Chan — Fifth Floor's Happiness
 JJ Lin — 100 Days
 Khalil Fong — Timeless
 Jam Hsiao — Princess

Best Female Pop Vocal Performance
 A-mei — A-MIT
 Cheer Chen — Immortal
 Karen Mok — Hui Wei
 Tanya Chua — If You See Him
 Tiger Huang — Simple/Not Simple

Best Music Video
 Will Lin, Chen Ying Zhi/ “Daylight” by Sodagreen

Best Composer
 Chen Hsiao Hsia “Singing in the Tree”

Best Lyricist
 Lin Hsi/Kai Men Jian Shan “Amit”

Best Musical Arranger
 Martin Teng/Hao Dan Ni Jiu Lai “Amit”

Best Album Producer
 Ah Di Zai “Amit”

Best Single Producer
 Mavis Fan “Owner”

Best Band
1976

Best Vocal Group
 Da Hsi Men
Xiao Fei Xing — katncandix2
Come On! Bay Bay! — Come On! Bay Bay!
Super Girl — Super Junior-M
Moving On — Power Station

Best New Artist
 Lala Hsu — Lala Hsu
 A-Chord — Nothing But A Chord
 Alisa Galper — Alisa Galper
 Shadya Lan — The Secret
 Soft Lipa — Winter Sweet

Best Taiwanese Male Singer
 Hsiao Huang-chi “People Who Love to Dream”

Best Taiwanese Female Singer
 Zeng Xin Mei “Go-Between”

Best Album
 Farming Together — Yen Yung-neng
 Dreamer — Hsiao Huang-chi
Live — Jody Chiang
 Film'' — Zhan Ya Wen

Best Hakka Singer
Emily Guan “Tou Bai De Ni”

Best Aboriginal Singer
Chalaw and Passiwali “Lao Lao Che”

Best Hakka Album

Best Aboriginal Album
 “Ba Bu Chuan Sho” Bunun Aboriginals

Best Album
 Paper Eagle/ Sizhukong Jazztet

Best Album Producer
 Peng Yu Wen/ Paper Eagle

Best Composer
 Li Yan Yun/Da Tao Cheng “Story Island”

Jury Award
 Li Zong Cheng, Luo Da You, Zhou Hua Jian, Chang Cheng Yue/ Zong Guan Xian SUPER BAND Bei Shang Lie Che

Special Contributions Award
 Ang It-hong

References

Golden Melody Awards
Golden Melody Awards
Golden Melody Awards
Golden Melody Awards